Rijeka Mosque (Croatian and Bosnian: Džamija u Rijeci) is a mosque in Rijeka, Croatia built between 2009 and 2013. The project of the mosque and the cultural center was originally developed by Dušan Džamonja in cooperation with Branko Vučinović and Darko Vlahović. The entire project costed 76 million Croatian kuna with significant contribution by the state of Qatar. Croatian media described the building as one of the most beautiful mosques in Europe. The mosque is a part of the Islamic Cultural Center which was built on the 10,816 square meters plot and which itself covers 5,291 square meters (3,612 square meters of closed space).

See also
Zagreb Mosque
Gunja Mosque
Islam in Croatia
Islamic Secondary School "Dr. Ahmed Smajlović"
Bosniaks of Croatia
Islam in Bosnia and Herzegovina

References

Mosques in Croatia
Bosniaks of Croatia
Mosques completed in 2013
2013 establishments in Croatia
Croatia–Qatar relations
Buildings and structures in Rijeka